Jay Gould (born April 1, 1979) is an American tech entrepreneur and the founder & CEO of Yashi.  Gould is also an active angel investor, and has backed web-based startups including DogVacay, Tout, Buffer, and Fitocracy.

Education
Gould graduated from Rowan University in 2001, where he earned a bachelor's degree in Law & Justice.

Career
In December 2005, Gould sold his first business to Bolt Media for an undisclosed amount and joined Bolt as its President. At the time of the sale, Gould's websites had 3.3 million U.S. unique visitors, according to comScore Media Metrics.

While under Gould's management, Bolt's revenue grew to $7 million annually, 5.3 million  U.S. visitors to their website monthly, culminating in signing a definitive agreement to sell the company for up to $30 million. Just prior to signing the $30 million definitive agreement, Universal Music Group filed a lawsuit against Bolt, MySpace and others for alleged copyright infringement. Bolt was ultimately unable to reach a settlement with Universal Music, which resulted in the termination of Bolt's $30 million acquisition, eventually leading Bolt to file an assignment for the benefit of creditors.

During Gould's tenure at Bolt, he co-founded WikiYou, which raised $500,000 from investors, including Mayfield Fund, First Round Capital, and Reid Hoffman.

Gould later founded GamersMedia, the first vertical-advertising network to bring brand advertisers to casual-gaming websites, which at its launch had over 20 million unique visitors across 40 sites. On February 2, 2015, the company was acquired by Nexstar Media Group for $33 million.

Yashi
Jay Gould and Caitlin Gould founded Yashi in 2007. Yashi became a location-focused advertising platform that targeted mobile and web video advertising.

The company was named to Inc. Magazine's Inc. 5000 list of the Fastest-Growing Private Companies in America for four consecutive years from 2012–2015.

Yashi was acquired by Nexstar Broadcasting Group on February 2, 2015, for $33 million.

Foundville
In October 2011, Gould launched foundville.com, a video podcast site featuring interviews with successful Internet entrepreneurs. Gould has interviewed founders of companies such as HotOrNot, RockYou, Adify, Mochi Media, CapLinked, The Receivables Exchange, Wikia, SitePoint, and others.

Investments
Gould is an angel investor, with sizable contributions to companies such as Buffer, CapLinked, Tout, iDoneThis, Fitocracy, and Cadee, among others. In March 2012, Gould was part of a $1 million funding initiative for DogVacay, an online marketplace for residential dog boarding.

In addition to startup capital, Gould also contributes his knowledge and expertise to entrepreneurs. He is a member of the Rowan University Entrepreneurship Program Advisor Council (ENTAC).

Awards and recognition
 On September 20, 2010, Gould was honored as a recipient of the NJBIZ Forty under 40 Award. The award recognizes up-and-coming businesspersons based in the New Jersey-New York area.
 In 2014, Gould was named an Ernst & Young Entrepreneur Of The Year Award finalist in New Jersey.

References 

1979 births
21st-century American businesspeople
Angel investors
Living people
Place of birth missing (living people)
Rowan University alumni